Harry Burgess (20 August 1904 – 6 October 1957) was an English footballer who played at Inside-left for Stockport County, Sheffield Wednesday where he won the league championship in 1929–30, and Chelsea. He won four caps for England scoring four goals.

Football career

Harry was born in Alderley Edge, Cheshire and played for Alderley Edge and Wilmslow Albion before appearing for Sandbach Ramblers in the Cheshire County League. In 1925 he signed for Stockport County making his debut on 13 March 1926 in the 4–0 defeat at Hull City. He made two more appearances in the 1925–26 season in which County were relegated from the Second Division. Harry finished the season on loan at Sandbach Ramblers but returned to Stockport ready for the 1926–27 season.

The Hatters were playing in Third Division (North) for the second time but unlike 1921–22 they could not bounce back and finished sixth in a season that Burgess flourished. He hit his first professional goal in a 3–3 draw with Lincoln at Edgeley Park on 4 September 1926 and continued strongly finishing the season as County's leading marksman with an impressive 28 goals from 35 matches. The following season County finished third with Harry scoring a dozen and in 1928–29 he once again top scored for the Hatters with 31 goals. Burgess' prodigious scoring talent and dribbling skills had attracted a number of First Division scouts to keep tabs on the 25-year-old and although Arsenal and Newcastle United made attempts to sign him, the lure of First Division champions The Wednesday was enough for him to move to Hillsborough on 29 June 1929 for a fee of £3,500 which was a record fee paid for a Stockport player.

Adding Harry to the team wasn't the only change The Wednesday made in the summer of 1929 with the 1929–30 season being the first with their new name Sheffield Wednesday. Burgess joined a great team of players under their manager Bob Brown and he quickly showed his worth scoring on his debut at Aston Villa on 14 September 1929. Wednesday went on to retain the title with Burgess scoring 19 goals controversially losing an FA Cup Semi-final to Huddersfield to miss out on the opportunity to be the first team to win the double in the 20th Century.

At the start of the 1930–31 season the newly married Harry's form for Wednesday attracted the attention of the England selectors and he made his debut on 20 October 1930 against Northern Ireland at Bramall Lane alongside the great Dixie Dean. He scored twice in a 5–1 England win, a match in which three other Wednesday players appeared Ernie Blenkinsop, Alf Strange and Tony Leach. This is one of the two occasions to date that Wednesday have had four players in the England team. He made three further appearances for the Three Lions during the season scoring another two goals.

That season Wednesday were again challenging for the First Division title this time against Arsenal under their great manager Herbert Chapman. Wednesday and Arsenal were first and second most of the season swapping positions regularly but three consecutive defeats put Wednesday out of the race and they disappointingly slipped to third in the end as the Gunners won the First Division title for the first time in the club's history, a title they would win five times in the Thirties. He played in Sheffield Wednesday's 2–1 defeat by Arsenal in the Charity Shield at Stamford Bridge in October 1930.

Wednesday flew out of the blocks in the 1931–32 season but a slump at the start of 1932 left them as low as 10th position. It took a tremendous seven wins from the final ten matches of the season for them to finish third for the second successive season. In 1932–33 Wednesday were back in a title race, again with Arsenal. injuries and suspensions tok their toll in the end and despite all their promise, the Owls again slipped to third.

Only five matches into the 1933–34 Wednesday lost their manager Bob Brown whose wife had recently died, the club's form took a slump and only managed to finish 11th but Harry was the club's leading goalscorer. Halfway through 1934–35 Harry, by now a fans' favourite, was transferred to Chelsea much to the chagrin of the Wednesday faithful. Harry had scored 77 goals in 234 matches during five successful years in Sheffield.

Club statistics

International statistics

References

External links
Player profile at stockportcounty.co.uk
International career at englandstats.com

1904 births
1957 deaths
Chelsea F.C. players
England international footballers
English footballers
Sheffield Wednesday F.C. players
Stockport County F.C. players
People from Alderley Edge
Sportspeople from Cheshire
Brentford F.C. wartime guest players
Association football forwards